The Belgian Socialist Party  (PSB; , BSP) was a social-democratic political party which existed in Belgium from 1945 to 1978. During its time in office, a number of progressive social reforms were introduced.

The BSP was founded by activists from the Belgian Labour Party (1885–1940), which was the first Belgian socialist party. It ceased to function during the Second World War, while Belgium was under Nazi occupation. Its main support bases were the co-operative and trade union movements, and it won relatively more support in Wallonia. Like most Belgian political organisations, the party supported greater integration with the European Economic Community, albeit in a socialist context.

As linguistic and community issues became more divisive, the Belgian Socialist Party split into two new entities: the Flemish Socialist Party for the Flemish community and the Parti Socialiste (PS) for the Francophone community.

Presidents

Election Results 

 From the 1971 General Election, the Belgian Socialist Party ran separate lists for Flanders and Wallonia, however they still existed under a single party. The letters in bold thus show the results of the combined lists and consequently the true result of the Belgian Socialist Party in each election
 Whilst the Belgian Socialist Party also ran separate lists for Flanders and Wallonia in the 1974 General Election, there is no information on the results of separate lists, hence only the result for the combined lists is shown.

See also
 Agusta scandal
 Charter of Quaregnon
 Socialist Party (francophone Belgium), also known as the Parti Socialiste or PS of Belgium, a French-speaking social democratic political party
 Socialist Party - Different (Flemish: Socialistische Partij - Anders), the Flemish social democratic party in Belgium. It was formerly known as SP, now as SP.a

References

Defunct socialist parties in Belgium
Political parties established in 1945
1945 establishments in Belgium
Defunct social democratic parties
Social democratic parties in Europe
1978 disestablishments in Belgium
Political parties disestablished in 1978